"Bad Attitude" is a song recorded by Australian group Girlfriend. The song was released in December 1992 as the fourth single from their debut studio album Make It Come True. The song peaked at number 28 on the ARIA Charts.

The song was originally recorded by Laura Branigan on her 1990 self titled album.

Track listing

Charts

References

1992 songs
1992 singles
Bertelsmann Music Group singles
Girlfriend (band) songs
Songs written by Steve Kipner